Nikita Kirillovich Dvurechensky (born July 30, 1991 in Lipetsk) is a Russian professional ice hockey forward who is currently playing for HC Shakhtyor Soligorsk of the Belarusian Extraleague.

He played in the Kontinental Hockey League (KHL) for Dynamo Moscow, HC Vityaz, HC Sibir Novosibirsk, Torpedo Nizhny Novgorod, Neftekhimik Nizhnekamsk and HC Yugra.

References

External links

1991 births
Living people
Russian ice hockey left wingers
Ariada Volzhsk players
Dizel Penza players
HK Dukla Michalovce players
HC Dynamo Moscow players
HC Neftekhimik Nizhnekamsk players
HC Sarov players
HC Shakhtyor Soligorsk players
HC Sibir Novosibirsk players
Sportspeople from Lipetsk
Torpedo Nizhny Novgorod players
HC Vityaz players
HC Yugra players
Russian expatriate ice hockey people
Russian expatriate sportspeople in Belarus
Russian expatriate sportspeople in Slovakia
Russian expatriate sportspeople in Kazakhstan
Expatriate ice hockey players in Slovakia
Expatriate ice hockey players in Belarus
Expatriate ice hockey players in Kazakhstan